Padmaram is a Gram panchayat in Kondurg mandal of Ranga Reddy district, Andhra Pradesh, India.

References

Villages in Ranga Reddy district